Pokhara Academy of Health Sciences is the teaching wing of Western Regional Hospital Pokhara, Nepal.
It offers Post-graduation MD/MS courses.

References

External links 
 https://pahs.gov.np/

Hospitals in Nepal